František Reich (31 October 1929 – 27 May 2021) was a Slovak rower who competed for Czechoslovakia. He competed at the 1952 Summer Olympics in Helsinki in men's single sculls where he was eliminated in the semi-finals repêchage. He competed at the 1956 Summer Olympics in Melbourne in men's double sculls where he was eliminated in the semi-finals repêchage. He died on 27 May 2021 in Bratislava.

References

1929 births
2021 deaths
Czechoslovak male rowers
Slovak male rowers
Olympic rowers of Czechoslovakia
Rowers at the 1952 Summer Olympics
Rowers at the 1956 Summer Olympics
Sportspeople from Žilina
European Rowing Championships medalists